Robert Hooper (1563-1639) was an English academic  during the 16th-century.

Hooper graduated B.A. from Balliol College, Oxford in 1558 and M.A. in 156o.. He was a Fellow of Magdalen from 1588 to 1603. A priest, he held the living at Fugglestone St Peter.He was Master of Balliol from 1563 to 1570.

Notes

16th-century English Anglican priests
Alumni of Balliol College, Oxford
Masters of Balliol College, Oxford